John Charles Broderick (June 5, 1877 – July 12, 1957) was a Canadian lacrosse player who competed in the 1908 Summer Olympics. He was part of the Canadian team which won the gold medal. He was the son of John (Sr.) and Johanna Broderick, née Flannigan. He never married. He is buried in St. Columban's Cemetery in Cornwall, Ontario and was inducted into the Cornwall Sports Hall of Fame in 1968.

References

External links
Jack Broderick's profile at Sports Reference.com
Jack Broderick at the Cornwall Sports Hall of Fame

1877 births
1957 deaths
Canadian lacrosse players
Olympic lacrosse players of Canada
Lacrosse players at the 1908 Summer Olympics
Olympic gold medalists for Canada
Medalists at the 1908 Summer Olympics